Cereal Pest: Gotcha Calls – The Double Album is the second album from prank call specialist Matt Tilley.  Once again, the tracks are taken from his radio show. It was certified Gold by the ARIA.

Track listing

Disc 1
 "Bull's Testicles"
 "The Big Woofer"
 "Poofters and Legends"
 "Corroboree"
 "Gooood Vibrations"
 "Tit for Tatt"
 "Who's Your Daddy?"
 "Me Love You Long Time"
 "Dog of a Day"
 "I Ain't No Queen"
 "Cheap Dad"
 "The Old HJ"
 "The Couple Does it Doggy"
 "My Pee Pee is Stuck"
 "Running Out of Lies"

Disc 2
 "The Epic"
 "The Tourette's Call"
 "Completely Legless"
 "Choke the Chicken"
 "Scoopy Scoop"
 "Swearing Granny #1"
 "Swearing Granny Strikes Again"
 "Desperate Housewife"
 "Oh... What a Feeling"
 "A Tranny on the Wireless"
 "Hit and Run"
 "My Big Fat Greek Wedding Tantrum"
 "Sorry"
 "The Lost Flock"

Charts

Certifications

References

2006 albums
Matt Tilley albums